Willy Collet (born 10 April 1913, date of death unknown) was a Belgian rower. He competed at the 1936 Summer Olympics and the 1948 Summer Olympics.

References

1913 births
Year of death missing
Belgian male rowers
Olympic rowers of Belgium
Rowers at the 1936 Summer Olympics
Rowers at the 1948 Summer Olympics
Sportspeople from Hasselt
20th-century Belgian people